A chakara (also Chaakara and in Malayalam ചാകര) is a peculiar marine phenomenon in which many fish and prawns throng together during a particular season as part of mud bank formations. The etymology relates to the local Dravidian wording "chaavu+Kara" meaning to die+land/shore, symbolising the huge stock of caught fish that piles up during this season. The word meaning have nothing to do with any Sanskrit origin as some believe. This rare phenomenon is observed only along the coastal waters of the Indian state of Kerala, especially around the coast of Purakkad, Kodungallur and in South America, where it has proved to be a boon for the local fisherfolk.

A correct scientific explanation about the formation of a chakara is debatable. However, a strongly supported theory is that during the monsoons, the water level of the backwaters rises which facilitates the movement of fine clay particles into the sea through the subterranean channels. The accumulation of organic material by this process in relatively calm regions of the sea during the monsoons attracts fish.

This phenomenon is demonstrated in the Malayalam film Chemmeen. It is greeted, celebrated, and described in the song "Puththan Valakkare."

Palke
The same phenomenon in Tulu regions is known as Palke

References

External links
 Malayalam's Own Monsoon
 

Malayalam terms
Fishing in India